Zachary Senyshyn (born March 30, 1997) is a Canadian professional ice hockey forward. He is currently playing for the Chicago Wolves of the American Hockey League (AHL). Senyshyn was selected by the Boston Bruins in the first round (15th overall) of the 2015 NHL Entry Draft. He was born in Ottawa, Ontario.

Playing career
Following the 2014–15 OHL season in which he scored 45 points in 65 games with the Sault Ste. Marie Greyhounds, Senyshyn was ranked number 38 by the NHL Central Scouting Bureau on their list of North American Skaters eligible for the 2015 NHL Entry Draft. Expected to be drafted in the middle of the second round, the Boston Bruins unexpectedly picked Senyshyn 15th overall with the pick acquired in exchange for Dougie Hamilton.

During the 2015–16 season, Senyshyn was signed to a three-year entry-level contract with the Boston Bruins on November 12, 2015. He was assigned to the Bruins American Hockey League (AHL) team, the Providence Bruins, in April 2017 to help them in their playoff run. Senyshyn then started the 2017–18 season with the Providence Bruins after being cut from Bruins training camp. Senyshyn was recalled on April 3, 2019, and played his first NHL game the following evening against the Minnesota Wild. He also scored his first NHL goal in that game, an empty net goal in a 3–0 Bruin win. He was sent back down to Providence on April 7.

On March 21, 2022, Senyshyn was traded by the Bruins, along with a 2022 fifth-round selection to the Ottawa Senators in exchange for Josh Brown and a conditional 2022 seventh-round draft pick. He was recalled by Ottawa from their AHL affiliate, the Belleville Senators, on April 17, 2022. He appeared in his first game for the Senators on April 20, 2022 versus the Seattle Kraken. He was re-assigned to Belleville on April 20.

A free agent at the end of the season, Senyshyn signed a professional tryout with the New Jersey Devils on September 14, 2022. Unable to crack the Devils lineup, Senyshyn signed a one-year contract to play with the AHL's Utica Comets in October 2022. In the 2022–23 season, Senyshyn appeared in 37 games with the Comets registering 6 goals and 9 points, before he was traded to the Chicago Wolves in exchange for future considerations on February 18, 2023.

Career statistics

Awards and honours

References

External links

1997 births
Living people
Belleville Senators players
Boston Bruins draft picks
Boston Bruins players
Canadian ice hockey right wingers
Chicago Wolves players
Ice hockey people from Ottawa
National Hockey League first-round draft picks
Ottawa Senators players
Providence Bruins players
Sault Ste. Marie Greyhounds players
Utica Comets players